Léon Pickers (27 July 1937 – 25 February 1968) was a Belgian water polo player. He competed at the 1960 Summer Olympics and the 1964 Summer Olympics.

References

External links
 

1937 births
1968 deaths
Belgian male water polo players
Olympic water polo players of Belgium
Water polo players at the 1960 Summer Olympics
Water polo players at the 1964 Summer Olympics
People from Etterbeek
Sportspeople from Brussels
20th-century Belgian people